Halychany is a village in Lviv Raion, Lviv Oblast in western Ukraine. It belongs to Horodok urban hromada, one of the hromadas of Ukraine. The population of the village is about 776 people.  
Local government is administered by Halychanivska village council.

Geography 

History 
The first mention of Halychany dates from the year 1473.

Until 18 July 2020, Halychany belonged to Horodok Raion. The raion was abolished in July 2020 as part of the administrative reform of Ukraine, which reduced the number of raions of Lviv Oblast to seven. The area of Horodok Raion was merged into Lviv Raion.

Cult constructions and religion 

An architectural monument of local importance of the Horodok district is in the village of Halychany.
It is the St. Cosmas and St. Damian's Greek Catholic Church, built in 1819 (1569M).

References

External links 
 E n c y c l o p e d i a   o f   S i g h t s, Gorodok district » Galychany
 weather.in.ua

Villages in Lviv Raion